A tactical nuclear weapon (TNW) or non-strategic nuclear weapon (NSNW) is a nuclear weapon that is designed to be used on a battlefield in military situations, mostly with friendly forces in proximity and perhaps even on contested friendly territory. Generally smaller in explosive power, they are defined in contrast to strategic nuclear weapons, which are designed mostly to be targeted at the enemy interior far away from the war front against military bases, cities, towns, arms industries, and other hardened or larger-area targets to damage the enemy's ability to wage war. As of 2023, no tactical nuclear weapon has ever been used in a combat situation.

Tactical nuclear weapons include gravity bombs, short-range missiles, artillery shells, land mines, depth charges, and torpedoes which are equipped with nuclear warheads. Also in this category are nuclear armed ground-based or shipborne surface-to-air missiles (SAMs) and air-to-air missiles. Small, two-man portable or truck-portable tactical weapons (sometimes misleadingly referred to as suitcase nukes), such as the Special Atomic Demolition Munition and the Davy Crockett recoilless rifle (recoilless smoothbore gun) have been developed, but the difficulty of combining sufficient yield with portability could limit their military utility. In wartime, such explosives could be used for demolishing "chokepoints" to enemy offensives, such as at tunnels, narrow mountain passes, and long viaducts.

There is no exact definition of the "tactical" category in terms of range or yield of the nuclear weapon. The yield of tactical nuclear weapons is generally lower than that of strategic nuclear weapons, but larger ones are still very powerful, and some variable-yield warheads serve in both roles. For example, the W89 200 kiloton warhead was intended to arm both the tactical Sea Lance anti-submarine rocket-propelled depth charge and the strategic bomber-launched SRAM II stand off missile. Modern tactical nuclear warheads have yields up to the tens of kilotons, or potentially hundreds, several times that of the weapons used in the atomic bombings of Hiroshima and Nagasaki. Specifically on the Korean Peninsula, with a nuclear North Korea facing off against a NPT-compliant South Korea, there have been calls to request a return of US-owned and -operated, short range, low yield nuclear weapons (called "tactical" by the US military) to provide a local strategic deterrent to the North's growing domestically-produced nuclear arsenal and delivery systems.

Some tactical nuclear weapons have specific features meant to enhance their battlefield characteristics, such as variable yield, which allow their explosive power to be varied over a wide range for different situations, or enhanced radiation weapons (the so-called "neutron bombs"), which are meant to maximize ionizing radiation exposure and to minimize blast effects.

Strategic missiles and bombers are assigned preplanned targets including enemy airfields, radars, and surface-to-air defenses, not only counterforce strikes on hardened or wide area bomber, submarine, and missile bases. The strategic mission is to eliminate the enemy nation's national defenses to enable following bombers and missiles to threaten the enemy nation's strategic forces, command, and economy more realistically, rather than targeting mobile military assets in nearly real time by using tactical weapons that are optimized for time-sensitive strike missions that are often close to friendly forces.

Tactical nuclear weapons were a large part of the peak nuclear weapons stockpile levels during the Cold War.
The risk that use of tactical nuclear weapons could unexpectedly lead to a rapid escalation of a war to full use of strategic weapons has led to proposals being made within NATO and other organizations to place limitations on—and make more transparent—the stockpiling and use of tactical weapons. As the Cold War came to an end in 1991, the US and USSR withdrew most of their tactical nuclear weapons from deployment and disposed of them . The thousands of tactical warheads wielded by both sides in the late-1980s declined to an estimated 230 American and 1,000 to 2,000 Russian Federation warheads in 2021, although estimates for Russia vary widely.

Yield
The yield varies for a tactical nuclear weapon from a fraction of a kiloton to approximately 50 kilotons. In comparison, a strategic nuclear weapon has a yield from 100 kilotons to over a megaton, with much larger warheads available.

Risk of escalating a conflict
Use of tactical nuclear weapons against similarly-armed opponents may carry a significant danger of escalating the conflict beyond anticipated boundaries, from the tactical to the strategic. The existence and deployment of small, low-yield tactical nuclear warheads could be a dangerous encouragement to forward-basing and pre-emptive nuclear warfare, as nuclear weapons with destructive yields of 10 tons of TNT (e.g., the W54 warhead design) might be used more willingly at times of crisis than warheads with yields of 100 kilotons.

The use of tactical nuclear weapons presents a risk of escalating the conflict until it reaches a tipping point that provokes the use of strategic nuclear weapons such as ICBMs. Additionally, the tactical nuclear weapons most likely to be used first (i.e., the smallest, low-yield weapons such as nuclear artillery dating from the 1960s) have usually been under less stringent political control at times of military combat crises than strategic weapons. Early Permissive Action Links could be as simple as a mechanical combination lock. If a relatively junior officer in control of a small tactical nuclear weapon (e.g., the M29 Davy Crockett) were in imminent danger of being overwhelmed by enemy forces, he could request permission to fire it and, due to decentralized control of warhead authorization, his request might quickly be granted during a crisis.

For these reasons, stockpiles of tactical nuclear warheads in most countries' arsenals have been dramatically reduced c. 2010, and the smallest types have been completely eliminated. Additionally, the increased sophistication of "Category F" PAL mechanisms and their associated communications infrastructure mean that centralized control of tactical nuclear warheads (by the country's most senior political leaders) can now be retained, even during combat.

Some variable yield nuclear warheads such as the B61 nuclear bomb have been produced in both tactical and strategic versions. Whereas the lowest selectable yield of a tactical B61 (Mod 3 and Mod 4) is 0.3 kilotons (300 tons), modern PAL mechanisms ensure that centralized political control is maintained over each weapon, including their destructive yields.

With the introduction of the B61 Mod 12, the United States will have four hundred identical nuclear bombs whose strategic or tactical nature will be set purely by the mission and target as well as type of aircraft on which they are carried.

According to several reports, including by the Carnegie Endowment for International Peace and Bulletin of the Atomic Scientists, as a result of the effectiveness and acceptability of USAF use of precision munitions with little collateral damage in the Kosovo conflict in what amounted to strategic destruction once only possible with nuclear weapons or massive bombing, Vladimir Putin, then-secretary of Security Council of Russia, formulated a concept ("escalate to de-escalate") of using both tactical and strategic nuclear threats and strikes to de-escalate or cause an enemy to disengage from a conventional conflict threatening what Russia considers a strategic interest. The lowered threshold for use of nuclear weapons by Russia is disputed by other experts.

Treaty control

Ten NATO member countries have advanced a confidence-building plan for NATO and Russia that could lead to treaties to reduce the tactical nuclear weapons in Europe.

, NATO was moving forward with a plan to upgrade its tactical nuclear weapons with precision guidance that would make them equivalent to strategic weapons in effects against hardened targets, and to carry them on stealth aircraft that are much more survivable against current air defenses.

Speculation on use in the 2022 Russian invasion of Ukraine

During the 2022 Russian invasion of Ukraine, there has been constant speculation about whether Russia's president Vladimir Putin will use a tactical nuclear bomb either against Ukraine or in a demonstration strike over unpopulated areas, given that the course of the war does not seem favorable to what the Kremlin anticipated, and several members of the Russian government have threatened the use of nuclear weapons.

Examples

B57 nuclear bomb
B61 nuclear bomb Mod-3,Mod-4,Mod -10
Blue Peacock
Nasr (tactical nuclear missile) 
W25 (nuclear warhead)
W33 (nuclear weapon)
W85
:Category:Nuclear mines
M-28 & M-29 Davy Crocketts with W54 nuclear warhead
Medium Atomic Demolition Munition
Shaurya
Red Beard
Special Atomic Demolition Munition
Nuclear artillery

See also
List of nuclear weapons

References

External links

CRS Report for Congress

 
Articles containing video clips